Guntai, or Warta Thuntai, is a Papuan language of New Guinea. Guntai-speaking villages are located along eastern banks of the Bensbach River.

References

Tonda languages
Languages of Western Province (Papua New Guinea)